The AAW Heavyweight Championship is a professional wrestling world heavyweight championship owned and promoted by AAW Wrestling. There have been a total of 32 reigns and one vacancy shared between 25 different champions. The current champion is Jake Something who is in his first reign.

Title history

Combined reigns

See also
AAW Tag Team Championship
AAW Heritage Championship
AAW Women's Championship

References

External links
AAW Official Website Title History
  AAA Heavyweight Championship

Heavyweight wrestling championships
AAW Wrestling championships